Mompha trithalama is a moth of the family Momphidae. It is native to Brazil, Peru and Trinidad, but was introduced to Hawaii for biological control of Clidemia hirta.

The larvae feed on Melastomataceae species, including Clidemia hirta. They feed internally on both flowers and berries. When flowers are attacked, no seeds are formed.

External links
Review And Status Of Biological Control Of Clidemia In Hawaii

Momphidae
Moths of Central America
Moths of South America
Lepidoptera used as pest control agents